Herbert Kitchener Richard Taylor (30 January 1899 – 31 May 1972) was an Australian rules footballer who played with Collingwood in the Victorian Football League (VFL).

Notes

External links 

Herb Taylor's profile at Collingwood Forever

1899 births
1972 deaths
Australian rules footballers from Melbourne
Collingwood Football Club players
People from Abbotsford, Victoria